Frank Sherman Henry (December 15, 1909 – August 25, 1989) was an American equestrian. He competed at the 1948 Summer Olympics and won a gold medal in team eventing and silver medals in individual eventing and team dressage, becoming the only American equestrian to win three medals at one Olympics.

Henry graduated from the United States Military Academy in 1933 and later worked as an instructor at various military stations. He was selected for the 1940 Olympics, but they were canceled due to World War II. During the war he served as at the United States Department of Defense. He retired from the army as a brigade general.

References

1909 births
1989 deaths
American dressage riders
American male equestrians
Equestrians at the 1948 Summer Olympics
Olympic gold medalists for the United States in equestrian
Olympic silver medalists for the United States in equestrian
American event riders
Medalists at the 1948 Summer Olympics
United States Military Academy alumni